Edge Technologies, Inc. is an American software company, focusing on the integration of secure web applications.  Edge provides software products and enterprise services to corporations and government agencies.  Edge was founded in 1993 and is headquartered in Arlington, Virginia. In 2017, the company was acquired by Lotus Innovations Fund.

Products
 enVision is the first software product to provide a web interface for HP Openview and Network Node Manager.
 Released in 2000, enPortal is a secure, integration Web portal.  It lets service providers or large enterprise customers view data from disparate network-management systems through a single Web interface. The enPortal customer base is primarily corporations and government agencies which use network management applications.  enPortal offers prepackaged Product Integration Modules (PIMs).  PIMs provide pre-built integration with commonly used applications, including products from Concord Communications, Hewlett-Packard, InfoVista, IBM/Tivoli Netcool, and Remedy.  Single sign-on allows the user to log into enPortal, which then automatically logs into all of the other applications integrated into the portal.  The software also can automate workflow, normalize and correlate events, and take action based on user-defined rules.
 Released in 2008, AppBoard is a data integration and visualization platform that allows for the rapid development and deployment of real-time business systems dashboards.  AppBoard consists of a series of Data Adapters, Widgets, and a dashboard Builder. In 2012, Edge released mobile versions of the AppBoard client for Android and iOS in conjunction with the version 2.2 release of AppBoard.
 Released in 2017, edgeSuite is a data integration and data visualization platform that aims to provide efficient development and deployment of real-time business systems dashboards. edgeCore allows users to connect, visualize, and interact with data in a user-friendly manner. edgeWeb allows users to integrate web-based interfaces. edgeRPA (add-on module released in 2019) provides for automation of tasks by Robotic Process Automation. edgeSuite is multi-platform.

See also
 Java Portlet specification

References

External links
 
 "Secure Portal-Based Information Display and Consolidation Technology" patent awarded in 2007

Business software
Companies based in Arlington County, Virginia
Companies established in 1993
Software companies based in Virginia
Software companies of the United States